Teply may refer to:
 Teplý, a Czech surname
 Tyoply, various Russian localities sometimes transliterated Teply

See also